The 1989–90 season is the 80th season of competitive football in Germany.

National teams

West Germany national football team

1990 FIFA World Cup qualification

1990 FIFA World Cup

Friendly matches

West Germany women's national football team

Women's Euro 1991 qualification

League season

Bundesliga

2. Bundesliga

DFB–Pokal

Sources

 
Seasons in German football